The 1960 Wisconsin Badgers football team represented the University of Wisconsin in the 1960 Big Ten Conference football season.

Schedule

Roster
DB Ron Vander Kelen

Team players in the 1961 NFL Draft

Team players in the 1961 AFL Draft

References

Wisconsin
Wisconsin Badgers football seasons
Wisconsin Badgers football